Ranbir Gangwa is an Indian politician. He was elected to the Haryana Legislative Assembly from Nalwa in the 2014 and 2019 Haryana Legislative Assembly election as a member of the Bharatiya Janata Party.

References 

1979 births
Living people
Bharatiya Janata Party politicians from Haryana
Indian National Lok Dal politicians
People from Hisar district
Haryana MLAs 2019–2024
Haryana MLAs 2014–2019